Manuel Osifo (born 31 July 2003) is a Belgian professional footballer who plays as a defender for Belgian First Division A club KV Oostende.

Career
Osifo signed his first professional contract with KV Oostende on 3 August 2021.

References

2003 births
Living people
Belgian footballers
Belgian people of Nigerian descent
Association football defenders
K.V. Oostende players
Belgian Pro League players